Thomas Norris (died 1424/5), of Chudleigh, Devon, was an English politician.

He was a Member (MP) of the Parliament of England for Barnstaple in February 1388, January 1390, 1394, and 1395, for Totnes in 1391 and for Plympton Erle in 1395 and January 1397.

References

14th-century births
1420s deaths
English MPs February 1388
Members of the Parliament of England (pre-1707) for Totnes
English MPs January 1390
English MPs 1394
English MPs 1395
English MPs 1391
English MPs January 1397
Members of the Parliament of England (pre-1707) for Barnstaple
Members of the Parliament of England for Plympton Erle